Frank Strandli (born 16 May 1972) is a Norwegian former professional footballer who played as a forward.

Club career
Strandli was recognised as a fast and physically strong striker. After success in IK Start, he signed for league champions Leeds United in 1993 and scored on his debut, coming off the bench against Middlesbrough. Still, he was not able to hold down a regular first team place.

He had been loaned to IK Start from May to July 1993, and in 1994 he was loaned to SK Brann, signing a permanent deal ahead of the 1995 season. After this earned success in Lillestrøm SK, scoring 15 times in 38 league games. This earned him a move to the Greek top club Panathinaikos.

His last professional club was AaB before he was forced to retire due to a groin injury. During his injury spell he received guidance from mental coach Christian M. Larsen. The coaching techniques Strandli learned at this stage of his career is believed to have helped him come back from injury. He made a return in 2009 with fellow footballer Andreas Lund when both joined FC Lund, a club in the Norwegian sixth tier as a central defender.

International career
Strandli played 24 matches for the Norway national team, thus being one cap away from earning the Norwegian Football Association Gold Watch.

International goals
Scores and results list Norway's goal tally first, score column indicates score after each Strandli goal.

References

External links

Living people
1972 births
Sportspeople from Kristiansand
Norwegian footballers
Association football forwards
Norway international footballers
Norway youth international footballers
Norway under-21 international footballers
IK Start players
Leeds United F.C. players
SK Brann players
Lillestrøm SK players
Panathinaikos F.C. players
AaB Fodbold players
Premier League players
Danish Superliga players
Eliteserien players
Super League Greece players
Norwegian expatriate footballers
Norwegian expatriate sportspeople in England
Expatriate footballers in England
Norwegian expatriate sportspeople in Greece
Expatriate footballers in Greece
Norwegian expatriate sportspeople in Denmark
Expatriate men's footballers in Denmark